James Wilson (24 August 1879 – 15 August 1943) was a Labour Party politician in the United Kingdom.  He was Member of Parliament (MP) for Dudley from 1921 to 1922,and for Oldham from 1929 to 1931.

References

External links 
 

1879 births
1943 deaths
Labour Party (UK) MPs for English constituencies
National Union of Railwaymen-sponsored MPs
UK MPs 1918–1922
UK MPs 1929–1931
Politics of the Metropolitan Borough of Oldham